Javier Velázquez (born 6 February 1924) was a Mexican sailor. He competed in the Dragon event at the 1968 Summer Olympics.

References

External links
 

1924 births
Possibly living people
Mexican male sailors (sport)
Olympic sailors of Mexico
Sailors at the 1968 Summer Olympics – Dragon
Sportspeople from Mexico City